Cutter's Way (originally titled Cutter and Bone) is a 1981 American neo noir thriller directed by Ivan Passer. The film stars Jeff Bridges, John Heard, and Lisa Eichhorn. The screenplay was adapted from the 1976 novel Cutter and Bone by Newton Thornburg.

Plot 
One rainy night in Santa Barbara, California, Richard Bone's car breaks down on a side road. He sees a large car draw up a little way behind him. A man throws something into a garbage can. At first, Bone thinks nothing of it and proceeds to meet his friend, Vietnam veteran Alex Cutter. The following day, a young girl who has been brutally murdered is found in the garbage can, and Bone becomes a suspect.

When Bone sees who he thinks is the same man in the Santa Barbara "Founder's Day Parade"local tycoon J.J. CordCutter begins to take an interest in the case. His interest soon becomes a conspiracy theory that develops into an investigation with his skeptical friend and the dead girl's sister, along for the ride. After Cutter attempts to blackmail Cord as a way of making Cord incriminate himself, Cutter's house mysteriously burns down with his wife, Mo, inside.

Convinced that Cord had been trying to silence Bone, Cutter begins researching Cord. He steals an invitation to a party at Cord's house and gets Bone to drive him. When Cutter tells Bone he plans to kill Cord, Bone attempts to leave the party but is blocked by other parked cars and instead goes after Cutter to convince him not to kill Cord. After being chased by security, Bone winds up in Cord's office. After a brief conversation in which Cord assumes that Cutter's war experience has made him paranoid, Cutter suddenly crashes through the window after stealing one of Cord's horses. As Cutter is dying from injuries from the broken glass, Bone asserts that Cord killed the girl. Cord states "What if it were?" Bone steadies Cutter's gun in Cutter's hand and fires the pistol as the film cuts to black.

Cast 

 Jeff Bridges as Richard Bone
 John Heard as Alex Cutter
 Lisa Eichhorn as Maureen "Mo" Cutter
 Stephen Elliott as J.J. Cord
 Arthur Rosenberg as George Swanson
 Nina van Pallandt as Woman In The Hotel
 Ann Dusenberry as Valerie Duran
 Chris Noth as Guard (uncredited)

Production history 
A friend of Jeffrey Alan Fiskin had Fiskin send a screenplay to Paul Gurian, a would-be film producer. Gurian eventually informed Fiskin that he had bought the rights to the novel Cutter and Bone, and wanted to meet with Fiskin in Los Angeles. Fiskin, who had little money, stole a copy of the book to read. In a 1981 interview, he said of the novel "The set-up's great, the characters are fine. But the last half of the book is an instant replay of Easy Rider. You cannot make a film out of this." Gurian agreed and hired Fiskin to write the screenplay. Gurian arranged for the studio EMI to back the film financially, with Robert Mulligan to direct and Dustin Hoffman to play Alex Cutter. However, a scheduling conflict forced Hoffman to leave the project. This prompted Mulligan to leave as well, and EMI to pull its money. Gurian took the film to United Artists, where the studio's vice president, David Field, became interested in backing it.

Gurian gave Fiskin a list of directors; Ivan Passer's name was the only one the screenwriter did not recognize. Fiskin and United Artists executives screened Passer's Intimate Lighting and agreed he was the man to direct Cutter and Bone. Passer was involved with another film, but after reading Fiskin's script, chose to do Cutter and Bone instead .

The initial budget was $3.3 million, but Field learned that United Artists would produce the movie only if the budget was $3 million and a star joined the cast. The studio liked Jeff Bridges' work in the dailies for Michael Cimino's Heaven's Gate and insisted on him for Cutter and Bone. Passer cast John Heard after seeing him in a Joseph Papp Shakespeare in the Park production of Othello. The studio wanted a star, but the director insisted on Heard. Lisa Eichhorn was cast as Mo after she auditioned with Bridges.

Reception 
United Artists did not like the ambiguity in what was then titled Cutter and Bone. When U.A. executives David Field and Claire Townsend, the film's biggest supporters, left for 20th Century Fox, the studio felt that they would get no credit if the film succeeded and no responsibility if it failed and so there was no interest in it. Cutter and Bone became a victim of internal politics. U.A. senior domestic sales and marketing vice president Jerry Esbin saw the film and decided that it did not have any commercial possibilities. Passer did not see his film with a paying audience until the Houston International Film Festival many weeks later. He said in an interview, "They didn't do any research. I was supposed to have two previews with a paying audience. It was in my contract."

United Artists spent a meager $63,000 on promotion for the film's release in New York City in late March 1981. There all three daily papers and the three major network critics gave Cutter and Bone negative reviews. Vincent Canby in The New York Times wrote "[I]t's the sort of picture that never wants to concede what it's about. It is, however, enchanted by the sound of its own dialogue, which is vivid without being informative or even amusing on any level." The studio was so shocked by the negative reviews that it planned to pull the film after only a week. Unbeknownst to them, the next week Richard Schickel in Time, David Ansen in Newsweek, and New York City's weekly newspapers would write glowing reviews. Ansen wrote, "Under Passer's sensitive direction, Heard gives his best film performance: he's funny and abrasive and mad, but you see the self-awareness eating him up inside." Jim Hoberman of The Village Voice was also an early champion of the film, calling it "a thriller but also a critique, underscoring its surgical title by performing a deft and mordant postmortem on the remains of the 1960s counterculture."

The positive reviews prompted United Artists to give Cutter and Bone to its United Artists Classics division, which changed the film's title to Cutter's Way (thinking that the original title would be mistaken by audiences for a comedy about surgeons) and entered it in film festivals. At Houston, Texas's Third International Film Festival, it won Best Picture, Best Director, Best Screenplay, and Best Actor (John Heard). A week later, it received the closing-feature slot at the Seattle International Film Festival. With a new ad campaign, Cutter's Way reopened in the summer of 1981 in Seattle, Los Angeles, Boston, and New York City. Passer was bitter about the experience, commenting in an interview, "You can assassinate movies as you can assassinate people. I think UA murdered the film. Or at least they tried to murder it."

In 1982, Fiskin won an Edgar Award from the Mystery Writers of America for Best Motion Picture Screenplay. In 1983, the film won the prestigious Grand Prix of the Belgian Film Critics Association.

Jonathan Rosenbaum of The Chicago Reader would later write that it was "probably Ivan Passer's best American feature...A major statement about post-60s disillusionment, with a wonderful performance by Lisa Eichhorn and shimmering, hallucinatory cinematography by Jordan Cronenweth." John Patterson of The Guardian called it "note-perfect" and a "masterpiece," praising all three of the lead performances while acknowledging the film required multiple viewings to perceive its strengths.

Cutter's Way holds a rating of 92% on Rotten Tomatoes, based on 24 reviews. The site's consensus reads, "A suitably cynical neo-noir that echoes the disillusionment of its era, Cutter's Way relies on character-driven drama further elevated by the work of an outstanding cast".

References

External links 
 
 
 

1981 films
1980s crime thriller films
American crime thriller films
American neo-noir films
Edgar Award-winning works
1980s English-language films
Films about amputees
Films based on American novels
Films based on thriller novels
Films directed by Ivan Passer
Films scored by Jack Nitzsche
Films set in Santa Barbara, California
United Artists films
1980s American films